The Women's Sprint was one of the 8 women's events at the 2008 European Track Championships, held in Pruszków, Poland.

11 cyclists participated in the contest.

The race was held on September 6.

Final results

References

 

2008 European Track Championships
Women's sprint (track cycling)